Linnéa Handberg Lund, (born Linnéa Handberg 22 October 1976 in Hillerød, Denmark) also known as Papaya and Miss Papaya, is a Danish musician. She has achieved Gold and Platinum status as a songwriter within Europe and Asia in the 2000s after her two albums released as an independent artist.

Several of her songs, including "Operator", "Hero", and "Pink Dinosaur", have appeared in the popular Dance Dance Revolution video games. Papaya has also contributed the songs "No Princess" and "Spaceman" to In The Groove 2, along with Dynamic Hero.

History 
Papaya began her music career in the early 1990s, signing with record labels Maverick, Warner, and Scandinavian Records. Papaya teamed up with producers Honeycutt to release the "Miss Papaya Project". Papaya released her first single, "Jingle Bells" in 1997. The next single, "Hero", was a smash hit.

Pink
Her first album, Pink, was released in 1998, produced by Papaya and Honeycutt. In 1998, "Hero" was released in the U.S. Two singles were released after Pink, "Supergirl" in 1998 and "Operator" in 1999. Papaya soon quit her contract with Scandinavian Records & Honeycutt, and abandoned the Miss Papaya Project. She began a solo career and in 2000 released an album, This Is Who I Am, under her real name. Papaya still works as a songwriter and backup singer for CH!PZ, from the Netherlands.

Papaya was an artist behind Bambee, writing many of Bambee's songs along with Honeycutt. Papaya released some songs under the pseudonym Lynn including "Are You Online?" and "No Princess", for Bambee and In The Groove 2, respectively.

Discography

Albums
Pink (as Papaya) (1998)
This is Who I Am (as Linnea) (2000)

Video games
Miss Papaya has a total of three songs which appear in the Dance Dance Revolution (DDR) arcade series and StepManiaX, plus two remixes of "Hero" in DDR. Two other songs appear in In the Groove 2 and StepManiaX.

A yellow check mark indicates:
 For 3rdMix: only the 3rdMix Plus edition includes "Hero (KCP Discotique ".
 For StepManiaX: "Spaceman" features Lynn and Bambee.

Sources 
EMI Music Japan, Trance Paradise The Best, Dancemania Extra, Dancemania X2, Dancemania Bass #6, Diamond Complete Edition, Zip Mania II, Zip Mania Best, Summer Story 2008

References

External links
Miss Payaya biography, news and discography at Bubblegum Dancer
The song "Hero" by Miss Papaya at YouTube.com

1976 births
21st-century Danish women singers
Living people
Danish pop singers
Danish women singer-songwriters
English-language singers from Denmark
20th-century Danish women singers
People from Hillerød Municipality
Video game musicians